Kiwa puravida is a species of deep-sea dwelling decapod, a member of the genus Kiwa, a genus of animals sometimes informally known as "yeti crabs".

The crabs live at deep-sea cold seeps where they feed on symbiotic Pseudomonadota, which they cultivate on hair-like projections on their claws. The bacteria metabolise hydrogen sulfide and methane produced by the seeps, and are harvested by the animals' comb-like mouthparts. Among the other deep-sea animals that make use of such symbionts this species is unique in that it actively waves its appendages over the vents in order to provide the bacteria with more oxygen and nutrients.

The only other members of its family, Kiwa hirsuta, and the Hoff crab, or Kiwa tyleri, are crabs with similarly hairy claws. Kiwa hirsuta was discovered in 2005 near Easter Island, whereas Kiwa tyleri was discovered in 2015 near the hydrothermal vents of East Scotia Ridge. The specific epithet puravida (literally "pure life") comes from a Costa Rican Spanish saying (used to answer "How are you doing?" or to say "Thanks"), a homage to where it was discovered.

References

External links
Video of Kiwa puravida waving its claws, Nature Newsteam YouTube Channel

Squat lobsters
Animals living on hydrothermal vents
Crustaceans described in 2011